Shooting Stars is a 2022 South Korean television series starring Lee Sung-kyung, Kim Young-dae, Yoon Jong-hoon, Kim Yoon-hye, Lee Jung-shin, and Park So-jin. It premiered on tvN on April 22, 2022, and aired every Friday and Saturday at 22:40 (KST) with 16 episodes. It is also available for streaming on iQIYI in selected regions.

Synopsis
The series is about the romantic and comedy love story of top star Gong Tae-sung sharing a love-hate relationship with Oh Han-byul, the PR team leader of his management agency Starforce Entertainment.

Cast

Main
 Lee Sung-kyung as Oh Han-byul
 Head of the public relations department of Star Force Entertainment. She is a person with extraordinary eloquence and excellent crisis response ability. She is also in charge of various departments such as public relations, crisis response, and communication, and dominates the industry.
 Kim Young-dae as Gong Tae-sung
 Moon Seong-hyun as teenage Gong Tae-sung 
 A top star actor who is signed with Star Force Entertainment. He is loved by the public for his bright smile like an angel with a polite and upright image. However, unknown to the public he harbours a scarred past.
 Yoon Jong-hoon as Kang Yu-sung
 A manager with good looks and good manners who is often mistaken for a celebrity.
 Kim Yoon-hye as Park Ho-young
 A former Taekwondo player turned manager.
 Lee Jung-shin as Do Soo-hyuk
 A corporation lawyer and the consultant of Star Force Entertainment.
 Park So-jin as Jo Ki-bum
 Oh Han-byul's close friend and entertainment reporter.

Supporting

Star Force Entertainment 
 Ha Do-kwon as Choi Ji-hoon
 Director of Star Force Entertainment.
 Jang Hee-ryung as Baek Da-hye
 An actress under the Star Force Entertainment, a fan of Gong Tae-sung. She stars in the drama 'The World of Stars' as the female lead, alongside Tae-sung.
 Lee Han-ik as Kang Min-kyu
 He was Tae-sung's new manager. Being unable to deal with Tae-sung's personality, he quit his job at Star Force and later joined DS actors.
 Jin Ho-eun as Byun Jeong-yeol
 A new manager under Star Force Entertainment. He becomes Tae-sung's new manager after Kang Min-kyu and protects Tae-sung with respect and pride to work with him.
 Shin Hyun-seung as Yoon Jae-hyun 
 A rookie actor under Star Force. He plays a supporting role in the drama 'The World of Stars'.
 Kwon Han-sol as Hong Bo-in
 The youngest member of Star Force Entertainment's PR team. A new employee full of stupid mistakes.
 Yoon Sang-jeong as Chae Eun-soo 
 PR team member of Star Force Entertainment.
 Im Sung-kyun as Lee Yoon-woo
 An actor under Star Force Entertainment who has been close friends with Taesung since he was a trainee.
 Jang Do-ha as Jang Seok-woo 
 An actor under Star Force Entertainment. He is a troublemaker who caused many dating rumors.

DS Actors 
 Kim Dae-gon as Han Dae-soo 
 CEO of DS Actors agency who was a manager at Star Force Entertainment.
 Lee Si-woo as Jin Yu-na
 A rookie actress under DS Actors. She plays a supporting role in the drama 'The World of Stars'.
 Kang Jun-gyu as Shim Jin-woo 
 An actor under DS Actors who moved from Star Force to DS with Dae-soo.

Others 
 Lee Seung-hyub as Kang Si-deok
 The owner of 'Sidokine', a famous soup restaurant in Daegu. He later becomes a rookie actor under Star Force after Park Ho-young convinced him and adopts stage name "Kang Yu-sung".
 Choi Ji-woo as Eun Si-woo / Kim Bok-soon
 A legendary actress representing the 90s, later revealed to be Gong Tae-sung's biological mother.
 So Hee-jung as Kwon Myung-hee
 Gong Tae-sung's housemaid who takes care of him with a warm and friendly personality, but harbours a different intention within her.
 Heo Gyu as Yuki
 The owner of Organic Bar, Hanbyul, Kibeom, and Hoyoung's hideout. More than anyone else, he is quick to hear about the entertainment industry.
 Yoo Gun-woo as Director Park Han-suk
The director of the drama 'The World of Stars' starring Tae Sung and Da Hye.
 Lee Joo-won as Yang Young-gi
 The director of OnStylebo where Jo Ki-bum works.
 Yoon Young-min as Lee Hae-min
 Veteran secretary of Su Hyuk's law firm Biho.

Special appearance 
 Park Jeong-min as Park Jo-eun, Oh Han-byul's blind date partner (Ep. 1)
 Yoon Byung-hee as Secretary of the Overseas Volunteer Group (Ep. 1)
 Seo Yi-sook as an actress under Star Force Entertainment (Ep. 1)
 Kim Seul-gi as Happy, a rookie singer (Ep. 2)
 Lee Ki-woo as Ahn Jun-ho, an actor under Star Force Entertainment (Ep. 3)
 Kang Ki-doong as Dong-jun, Ahn Jun-ho's manager (Ep. 3)
 Lee Sang-woo Han Seung-Il, a famous actor newly signed with Star Force (Ep. 4)
 Chae Jong-hyeop as Ham Yu-jin, an actor (Ep. 5)
 Oh Eui-shik as Cha Min-ho, entertainment department reporter and Jo Ki-bum's ex-boyfriend (Ep. 6)
 Moon Ga-young as Yeo Ha-jin, an actress who was rumoured to be dating Gong Tae-sung in the past (Ep. 6, 8)
 Song Ji-hyo as Song Ji-hee, an actress (Ep. 7) 
 Kim Dong-wook as Lee Jung-hoon (Ep. 8)
 Jin Ki-joo as Kim Jin-kyung, Entertainment Public Relations Manager (Ep.11) 
 Lee Sang-yeob as Do Ji-hyuk, an attorney and Do Soo-hyuk's elder brother (Ep.11) 
 Um Ki-joon as Yoon Jang-seok, an actor (Ep.13) 
 Bong Tae-gyu as Sung Woo-ju, CEO of Yoon Jang-seok's agency (Ep. 13)

Production

Filming 
On March 11, 2022, it was confirmed that actor Ha Do-kwon contracted COVID-19 and all filming schedules have been cancelled.

Casting 
Previously, Kim Young-dae worked together with both Yoon Jong-hoon and Ha Do-kwon in The Penthouse: War in Life; this will be their first reunion project after the end of the three-season Penthouse.

Release 
On March 3, 2022, photos from the official script reading were published.

Original soundtrack

Part 1

Part 2

Part 3

Part 4

Part 5

Viewership

Notes

References

External links
  
 
 

TVN (South Korean TV channel) television dramas
Korean-language television shows
2022 South Korean television series debuts
2022 South Korean television series endings
Television series by Studio Dragon
South Korean romantic comedy television series
Television productions suspended due to the COVID-19 pandemic